Oriya (also spelled Odia) may refer to:
 Odia people in India
 Odia language, an Indian language, belonging to the Indo-Aryan branch of the Indo-European language family
 Odia script, a writing system used for the Oriya language
 Oriya (Unicode block), a block of Oriya characters in Unicode

See also
 Orya (disambiguation)
 Odia (disambiguation)
 
 

Language and nationality disambiguation pages